Beta-lytic metalloendopeptidase (Myxobacter beta-lytic proteinase, achromopeptidase component, beta-lytic metalloproteinase, beta-lytic protease, Myxobacterium sorangium beta-lytic proteinase, Myxobacter495 beta-lytic proteinase) is an enzyme. This enzyme catalyses the following chemical reaction

 Cleavage of N-acetylmuramoyl-Ala, and of the insulin B chain at Gly23-Phe  >  Val18-Cya

This enzyme is present in Achromobacter lyticus and Lysobacter enzymogenes.

References

External links 
 

EC 3.4.24